Marine Johnson is a Canadian actress from Quebec. She is most noted for her performance in the 2017 film The Little Girl Who Was Too Fond of Matches (La petite fille qui aimait trop les allumettes), for which she received a Canadian Screen Award nomination for Best Actress at the 6th Canadian Screen Awards, and a Prix Iris nomination for Revelation of the Year at the 20th Quebec Cinema Awards.

She had her first acting role in Anaïs Barbeau-Lavalette and André Turpin's 2012 short film Ina Litovski; in 2020 she appeared in Barbeau-Lavalette's feature film Goddess of the Fireflies (La déesse des mouches à feu).

In 2021 she appeared in Ivan Grbovic's film Drunken Birds (Les Oiseaux ivres), for which she received a Canadian Screen Award nomination for Best Supporting Actress at the 10th Canadian Screen Awards.

References

External links

Canadian child actresses
Canadian film actresses
Actresses from Quebec
French Quebecers
Living people
Year of birth missing (living people)